The Rip Curl Pro 2013 was an event of the Association of Surfing Professionals for 2014 ASP World Tour.

This event was held from 16 to 27 April and contested by 36 surfers.

The tournament was won by Mick Fanning (AUS), who beat Taj Burrow (AUS) in final.

Round 1

Round 2

Round 3

Round 4

Round 5

Quarter-finals

Semi-finals

Final

References
 Site ASP

2014 in surfing
2014 in Australian sport
Sports competitions in Victoria (Australia)